Marianne is a 1929 pre-Code romantic-musical film set at the end of World War I.  Marianne is French farm girl who, although her French fiancé is away, fighting, falls in love with an American soldier. It is a remake of a silent film that was released earlier in 1929. Although the films feature mostly different casts, Marion Davies starred in both versions. This was Davies' first released talking movie. The pictures were released less than eleven years after the Armistice, and the title would have had a profound meaning for European audiences. “Marianne” has been a beloved personification of France and the battle for democracy—and the courage of French women in particular—since the Revolution. She was a key figure in French propaganda, and American men who served in Europe in 1917-1918 would have seen representations of her all around them, in public buildings, on posters and in newspapers, on coins and postage stamps.

Cast
 Marion Davies as Marianne
 Lawrence Gray as Private Stagg
 Cliff Edwards as "Soapy" Soapstone
 Benny Rubin as Sam "Sammy" Samuels
 George Baxter as André
 Scott Kolk as Lieutenant Frane
 Robert Edeson as The General
 Émile Chautard as Père Joseph

Music
The song “Just You, Just Me”, composed by Jesse Greer, with lyrics by Raymond Klages, was introduced in this film by Lawrence Gray, playing the ukulele, and Marion Davies in a comic reprise. It quickly became a standard, and has been covered by countless performers through almost a century. Greer and Klages also wrote “Hang on to Me”. They are given on-screen credits for “Interpolations,” along with Nacio Herb Brown and Arthur Freed, who wrote “Blondy”.

The “Music and Lyrics” credit goes to Roy Turk and Fred E Ahlert, who were responsible for “Marianne”, “When I See My Sugar”, “Oo-la-la-la-la” and “The Girl from Noochateau”. All these songs were composed in 1929.

Songs popularized during the war include: “Oh! Frenchy”, music by Con Conrad and words by Sam Ehrlich. “Where Do We Go From Here?.” by Howard Johnson and Percy Renrich.

Reception
Mordaunt Hall of the New York Times gave the film a lukewarm review, stating "As a quasi-musical comedy plot it is entertaining, but as a story its comedy is far from fresh." He also noted that the film was "by no means a production that is suited to Miss Davies's talents."

References

External links
 
 
 
 

1929 films
1920s romantic musical films
1929 romantic drama films
American black-and-white films
American romantic drama films
Films directed by Robert Z. Leonard
Metro-Goldwyn-Mayer films
Transitional sound films
American World War I films
American musical drama films
Early sound films
1920s American films